search.ch is a search engine and web portal based in Zürich Switzerland. It was founded in 1995 by Rudolf Räber and Bernhard Seefeld as a regional search engine. In the following years, many other services were added. For example a phone book in 1999 and a free SMS service in 2000 (now reduced to only one free message per week).

The search engine allows the user to restrict their search to a specific region of Switzerland, such as a canton or a city. The web crawler only looks at sites with in the .ch and .li top-level domains and a select number of Swiss websites on other TLDs. The index is updated weekly.

References

External links 
 search.ch

Web portals
Internet search engines
Directories